Private peer-to-peer (P2P) systems are peer-to-peer (P2P) systems that allow only mutually trusted peers to participate. This can be achieved by using a central server such as a Direct Connect hub to authenticate clients. Alternatively, users can exchange passwords or cryptographic keys with friends to form a decentralized network. Private peer-to-peer systems can be divided into friend-to-friend (F2F) and group-based systems. Friend-to-friend systems only allow connections between users who know one another, but may also provide automatic anonymous forwarding. Group-based systems allow any user to connect to any other, and thus they cannot grow in size without compromising their users' privacy. Some software, such as WASTE, can be configured to create either group-based or F2F networks.

Software list
Direct Connect - file sharing and chat using private hubs
GigaTribe - a private community-oriented file-sharing program
Retroshare - a private F2F system based on PGP, implementing Turtle F2F file sharing.
n2n - a peer-to-peer VPN software

The following software titles have been discontinued.
Infinit - file sharing app with local encryption based on research made at the University of Cambridge.
Madster (formerly Aimster) - early P2P software that used a buddy list to restrict sharing
Groove - a corporate groupware software based on P2P technology

Turtle F2F - instant messaging and file sharing with private connections only
WASTE - private P2P software suitable for groups of 10 to 50 users

See also
Friend-to-friend
Darknet
LAN messenger
Social VPN

References

How to disappear completely: A survey of private peer-to-peer networks. SPACE 2007 workshop, July 2007. 
Comparison of P2P file sharing tools for LAN parties.

File sharing
Peer-to-peer